Sebastian Konrad (born December 11, 1971 in Oborniki) is a Polish actor. He appeared in the  television series Aby do świtu... in 1992.

Filmography

References

External links

Polish male actors
1971 births
Living people